Adrian V Stokes (25 June 1945 – 7 April 2020) was a British computer scientist who was one of the founders of the internet including the first implementation of email in the UK.

Education 
Stokes earned a BSc in Chemistry and a PhD in Theoretical Chemistry at University College London and he then went on to specialise in computer science.

Career 
In 1973, whilst a research assistant at the Institute of Computer Science, University College London, Adrian was involved with a research team who were working on ARPANET, the experimental computer network of the United States Department of Defense. ARPANET became the Internet in the mid-1970s, and one of Adrian's responsibilities was the implementation of email in the UK.

Personal life 

Stokes had spina bifida. He campaigned on behalf of people with disabilities for decades. He was the president  of Disabled Motoring UK.

Awards and honours 

Stokes was made an Officer of the Order of the British Empire (OBE) for services to disabled people in 1983.

Stokes was recognised as one of the founders of the internet with a plaque by Stanford University.

References 

1945 births
Mill Hill
British computer scientists
Alumni of University College London
Officers of the Order of the British Empire
People with spina bifida
2020 deaths